Treaty of Montreuil may refer to:
Treaty of Montreuil (1274) between England and Flanders
Treaty of Montreuil (1299) between England and France